Alexander Woentin (born 3 July 2000) is a speedway rider from Sweden.

Speedway career 
Woentin came to prominence in 2017, when he qualified for the finals of both the World U21 Championship and the European U19 Championship.

The following year he became a regular member of the Sweden national under-21 speedway team and helped them reach the 2018 Team Junior European Championship final. During 2019, he reached the finals of the European U21 and U19 Championships before he was selected for the Sweden national speedway team where he stood as reserve during the 2020 Speedway of Nations. He also won a bronze medal at the 2020 Junior European Championship.

He finished 9th in the 2021 Speedway Under-21 World Championship and 7th in the 2021 Team Speedway Junior World Championship. 

In 2022, he rode for Dackarna in the Swedish Eliserien (the highest league in Sweden).

References 

Living people
2000 births
Swedish speedway riders